Ollusion is the third studio album by American R&B singer Omarion. It was released on January 12, 2010, by EMI, StarrWorld Entertainment, and MusicWorks. The album sold 21,200 copies its first week of sales.

Background
Omarion asked for a release from Sony BMG in early 2009. In mid August, he was announced on the roster of Lil Wayne's label Young Money Entertainment. After rumors surfaced that he was dropped for leaking the song "I Get It In" later that week, it was proven to be false as an interview with Lil Wayne himself he stated that it was "just business", and that Omarion asked for the release. He ultimately released Ollusion on his own imprint, StarrWorld Entertainment.

Singles
"I Get It In" featuring rapper Gucci Mane, was released as the lead single from Ollusion on November 24, 2009. The song was previously recorded with Lil Wayne but re-recorded and released featuring Gucci Mane, because he had left the rapper's record label Young Money Entertainment The song was co-written by American singer-songwriter Tank, in collaboration with Omarion and J. Valentine, and produced by the duo Song Dynasty. The song peaked at number 83 on the US Billboard Hot 100 chart, and number 20 on the US Hot R&B/Hip-Hop Songs. Original version of the song peaked at number 89 on the US Billboard Hot 100 chart. "Speedin'" was released January 12, 2010 as the second single. The song as written by Omarion and group 253 (Derek "D.C." Clark, Michael "M.I." Cole, Emmanuel "Peanut" Frayer and Chris "Breez" Fuller), and produced by the same. The song debuted at number 73 on the US Hot R&B/Hip-Hop Songs and number 5 on the US Bubbling Under Hot 100 Singles. "Last Night (Kinkos)", produced by Drum Up (LaMar Seymour, LaNelle Seymour) for Drum Up Digital, was released May 11, 2010 as the third single. It debuted at number 88 on the US Hot R&B/Hip-Hop Songs. Official remix for the song features West Coast rapper Snoop Dogg.

Critical reception

Ollusion received generally positive reviews from contemporary music critics. At Metacritic, which assigns a normalised rating out of 100 to reviews from mainstream critics, the album received an average score of 71, which indicates "generally favorable reviews", based on 4 reviews. Allmusic's editor Andy Kellman found it "Almost all of these beats would be classified as snapping, slapping, or smacking before banging, flecked with details yet simultaneously somewhat half-assed-sounding. Given the number of partially detached vocals, filled with android-in-heat impersonations, clipped-phrase drop-ins, and messing around, it's as if Omarion wanted to make a concerted attempt to downplay his vocal ability, which only adds to the album's weird, teasing charm.". Monica Herrera of Billboard magazine wrote that the album "The set come off more like a bid for street cred than maturation. Lyrics full of hip-hop bravado over dirty, and distortion-heavy beats. But when Omarion reaches for the high notes, he shines like a seasoned star.". Jon Caramanica of The New York Times wrote that "Clunky lyrics are everywhere, undoing some of the progress Omarion has made. The otherwise lovely "Speedin'," Omarion's most convincing song here.".

Commercial performance
The album debuted at number 19 on the US Billboard 200 and number seven on the US Billboard Top R&B/Hip-Hop Albums, with first-week sales of 19,300 copies in the United States, far below his last album, which also debuted at number one with 188,000 copies. Ollusion sold 78,000 copies as of May 4, 2012.

Track listing
Track list credits adapted from AllMusic.

Personnel
Credits for Ollusion adapted from Allmusic.

253 Music, Inc. – producer, background vocals
Elvis Aponte – engineer, mixing
Ayeesha – hair stylist
Lonny Bereal – producer
Claudio Cueni – engineer, mixing, producer
Eric Eylands – assistant engineer
Drum Up – producer
Noel "Detail" Fisher – engineer, mixing, producer
Brian "Big Bass" Gardner – mastering
Gucci Mane – featured artist
Marques Houston – featured artist, primary artist, producer
Naima Jamal – make-up
Harvey Mason, Jr. – mixing
Naruto's Melodys – producer
Omarion – creative director, executive producer, primary artist
Jay Rock – featured artist
Battle Roy – musician, producer
Nicki Saglimbeni – photography
Chris Stokes – A&R, creative director, executive producer
J. Valentine – engineer
Eric Weaver – assistant engineer

Charts

Weekly charts

Year-end charts

References

2010 albums
Omarion albums
Albums produced by T-Pain
Albums produced by the Neptunes